TNA One Night Only (2015) is a series of professional wrestling One Night Only events held by Total Nonstop Action Wrestling (TNA) in 2015.

Turning Point

One Night Only: Turning Point was a professional wrestling pay-per-view (PPV) event produced by Total Nonstop Action Wrestling (TNA). The show was taped on September 5, 2014, at the John Paul Jones Arena in Charlottesville, Virginia and aired on PPV on January 9, 2015.

Rivals

One Night Only: Rivals was a professional wrestling pay-per-view (PPV) event produced by Total Nonstop Action Wrestling (TNA), where TNA held a series of matches featuring various TNA wrestlers renewing their heated feuds from TNA's past. The show was taped on September 6, 2014, at the Royal Palace Theatre in Roanoke Rapids, North Carolina, and aired on PPV on February 6, 2015.

 Four-Way Elimination match

Joker's Wild 2015

One Night Only: Joker's Wild 2015 was a professional wrestling pay-per-view (PPV) event produced by Total Nonstop Action Wrestling (TNA). Thirty men and two Knockouts compete in a tournament for US$100,000 prize. The event was made up of tag team matches in which the partners are randomly drawn in a lottery and teams will work together to advance to the main event battle royal, with the grand prize of $100,000. It took place on February 14, 2015, from the Impact Zone at Universal Studios in Orlando, Florida, and aired on PPV on March 6, 2015

 Gauntlet Battle Royal

Hardcore Justice 2015

One Night Only: Hardcore Justice 2015 was a professional wrestling pay-per-view (PPV) event produced by Total Nonstop Action Wrestling (TNA). Hardcore rules for the stars of Hardcore wrestling, as TNA goes hardcore for one night only where every match is contested under hardcore wrestling stipulations. It took place on February 13, 2015, from the Impact Zone in Universal Studios in Orlando, Florida, and aired on PPV on April 1, 2015.

 Hardcore gauntlet battle royal

X-Travaganza 2015

One Night Only: X-Travaganza 2015 was a professional wrestling pay-per-view (PPV) event produced by Total Nonstop Action Wrestling (TNA). TNA held series of matches featuring various X-Division wrestlers paying tribute and honoring the X-Division. During the event, 6 of the matches where qualifying matches where the winner, would move on to compete in an Ultimate X match. It took place on February 15, 2015, from the Impact Zone in Universal Studios in Orlando, Florida, and aired on PPV on May 6, 2015.

Knockouts Knockdown 2015

One Night Only: Knockouts Knockdown 2015 was a professional wrestling pay-per-view (PPV) event produced by Total Nonstop Action Wrestling (TNA). TNA held a series of matches featuring various TNA Knockouts and several indie women. The winner of these matches would advance farther in Knockouts Gauntlet match to crown the "Queen of the Knockouts". It took place on February 14, 2015, from the Impact Zone in Universal Studios in Orlando, Florida, and Aired on PPV on July 1, 2015.

 Six-person intergender elimination tag team match

 Gauntlet Battle Royal

World Cup 2015

One Night Only: World Cup 2015 was a professional wrestling pay-per-view (PPV) event produced by Total Nonstop Action Wrestling (TNA). Teams of wrestlers and Knockouts led by a female TNA wrestler would compete in singles, tag team and Knockouts matches. The team that gained the most points qualified to the final match to fight for TNA World Cup. The event took place on February 15, 2015, from the Impact Zone in Universal Studios in Orlando, Florida and aired on PPV on August 5, 2015.

Teams and members
.

 Team Young
 Eric Young (Captain)
 Abyss
 Bram
 Manik
 Samuel Shaw
 Havok

 Team Hardy
 Jeff Hardy (Captain)
 Davey Richards
 Gunner
 Rockstar Spud
 Crazzy Steve
 Gail Kim

 Team EC3
 Ethan Carter III (Captain)
 James Storm
 Robbie E
 Jessie Godderz
 Tyrus
 Awesome Kong

 Team Roode
 Bobby Roode (Captain)
 Mr. Anderson
 Lashley
 Magnus
 Austin Aries
 Taryn Terrell

 Points

 Twelve-person elimination tag team match

Gut Check

One Night Only: Gut Check was a professional wrestling pay-per-view (PPV) event produced by Total Nonstop Action Wrestling (TNA). TNA held a series of matches featuring ten Gut Check participants, who competed in singles matches and tag match against ten members of the active roster: if they would win, they would move on to compete in the main event match where the winner of that match earns an appearance on the next live Impact Wrestling. It took place on February 16, 2015, from the Impact Zone in Universal Studios in Orlando, Florida and Aired in PPV on September 4, 2015.

 Five-way elimination match

The TNA Classic

One Night Only: The TNA Classic was a professional wrestling pay-per-view (PPV) event produced by Total Nonstop Action Wrestling (TNA). TNA held a 16-man tournament where the winner will be crowned the winner of the TNA Classic. It took place on February 16, 2015, from the Impact Zone in Universal Studios in Orlando, Florida and aired on PPV November 6, 2015.

Global Impact – USA vs. The World

One Night Only: Global Impact – USA vs. The World was a professional wrestling pay-per-view (PPV) event produced by Total Nonstop Action Wrestling (TNA). Two teams divided into team USA and team of wrestlers from around the world compete in heavyweight, X Division and Knockouts Division matches, The team that accumulated the most points was declared the winner. It took place on February 13, 2015, from the Impact Zone in Universal Studios in Orlando, Florida and aired on PPV December 4, 2015.

Teams and members

 Team USA
  Ethan Carter III
  James Storm
  Mr. Anderson
  Gunner
  Austin Aries
  Davey Richards
  Eddie Edwards
  Jessie Godderz
  DJ Z
  Taryn Terrell

 Team International
  The Great Muta
  The Great Sanada
  Tigre Uno
  Magnus
  Bram
  Rockstar Spud
  Drew Galloway
  Khoya
  Sonjay Dutt
  Angelina Love

 Points

References

2015 in professional wrestling
2015
Professional wrestling in Orlando, Florida
Professional wrestling in North Carolina
Professional wrestling in Virginia
2015 in professional wrestling in Florida
2015 in North Carolina
2015 in Virginia
Events in Orlando, Florida
Events in North Carolina
Events in Virginia